The Engenho Gargaú Private Natural Heritage Reserve is a private natural heritage reserve in the state of Paraíba, Brazil.

Establishment

It was created by decree on 15 June 1994.
Before it was created the reserve had been exploited for timber and agricultural crops.

Fauna

It was thought that the blond capuchin monkey (Cebus flavius) was extinct, but it has been rediscovered in two Atlantic Forest fragments in Paraíba, the Camaratuba  Experimental Station and the Gargaú reserve.
The animals are listed as Critically Endangered on the IUCN Red List.
Sample animals were captured and examined in the Gargaú reserve. 
They seemed healthy and sufficiently genetically diverse to form a viable population.
The reserve is also home to the red-handed howler (Alouatta belzebul) and common marmoset (Callithrix jacchus).

Notes

Sources

1994 establishments in Brazil
Protected areas of Paraíba
Private natural heritage reserves of Brazil
Protected areas established in 1994